Hunter Valley Wildlife Park, formerly Hunter Valley Zoo, is a zoo in Nulkaba, New South Wales, Australia. It features a wide variety of Australian and exotic mammals, birds and reptiles.

Founded in 2007 as the Hunter Valley Zoo, in July 2021 it was purchased by Australian Wildlife Parks and in November 2021 rebranded as Hunter Valley Wildlife Park.

Species list

                    

Birds

Australian native
Australian bustard
Australian king parrot
Black-necked stork
Brolga
Bush stone-curlew
Channel-billed cuckoo
Eclectus parrot
Emu
Galah
Laughing kookaburra
Major Mitchell's cockatoo
Masked lapwing
Rainbow lorikeet
Red-collared lorikeet.
Red-tailed black cockatoo
Scaly-breasted lorikeet
Sulphur crested cockatoo
Tawny frogmouth
Exotic
Blue and gold macaw
Ostrich
Sun conure

Mammals

Australian native
Common wombat
Dingo
Koala
Quokka
Red kangaroo
Red-necked wallaby
Rufous bettong
Short-beaked echidna
Southern hairy nosed wombat
Spectacled flying fox
Swamp wallaby
Western grey kangaroo
Yellow-footed rock-wallaby
Exotic
African lion (including white-coated)
American bison
Barbary sheep
Binturong
Black handed spider monkey
Black-and-white ruffed lemur
Blackbuck
Bolivian squirrel monkey
Brazilian agouti
Capybara
Caracal
Cheetah
Common marmoset
Cotton-top tamarin
Dromedary camel
Emperor tamarin
Fallow deer
Giraffe
Maned wolf
Meerkat
Patagonian mara
Plains zebra
Pygmy marmoset
Red-handed tamarin
Ring-tailed lemur
Serval
Tufted capuchin

Reptiles

Australian native
Central bearded dragon
Eastern bearded dragon
Eastern blue-tongued lizard
Shingleback lizard
Exotic
Rhinoceros iguana
African spurred tortoise
American alligator
Leopard tortoise.

References

External links

City of Cessnock
Zoos established in 2007
Zoos in New South Wales
2007 establishments in Australia